Robert Martin Patterson (born April 16, 1948) is a retired United States Army soldier and a recipient of the United States military's highest decoration, the Medal of Honor, for his actions in the Vietnam War.

Military career

Patterson grew up in a family of tobacco farmers in Fayetteville, North Carolina. Patterson joined the United States Army from Raleigh, North Carolina, in 1966, and by May 6, 1968, was serving as a specialist four in Troop B, 2nd Squadron, 17th Cavalry Regiment. During a firefight on that day, near La Chu, Thừa Thiên Province, South Vietnam, during the May Offensive, Patterson single-handedly destroyed a series of enemy bunkers. For his actions during the battle, he was awarded the Medal of Honor and promoted to sergeant.

In the mid-1970s, Patterson, by then a staff sergeant, served as a Basic Training drill sergeant at Fort Bliss, Texas.

Patterson reached the army's highest enlisted rank, Command Sergeant Major, and served in the Gulf War before retiring in 1991.

Later life
Patterson resides in Pensacola, Florida, having moved there in 2010.

Medal of Honor citation
Patterson's official Medal of Honor citation reads:

See also

List of Medal of Honor recipients for the Vietnam War

References

External links

 

1948 births
Living people
United States Army personnel of the Vietnam War
United States Army Medal of Honor recipients
People from Durham, North Carolina
United States Army soldiers
Vietnam War recipients of the Medal of Honor